Gilles Échevin (born 1 September 1948 in Bouillante, Guadeloupe) is a French athlete who specialises in the 100 meters. Echevin competed in the men's 100 meters at the 1976 Summer Olympics.

References  

 

French male sprinters
Olympic athletes of France
French people of Guadeloupean descent
Guadeloupean male sprinters
Living people
1948 births
Athletes (track and field) at the 1976 Summer Olympics
Mediterranean Games gold medalists for France
Athletes (track and field) at the 1975 Mediterranean Games
Mediterranean Games medalists in athletics